The 38th Division (38. Division) was a unit of the Prussian/German Army. It was formed on April 1, 1899, and was headquartered in Erfurt.  The division was subordinated in peacetime to the XI Army Corps (XI. Armeekorps). The division was disbanded in 1919 during the demobilization of the German Army after World War I.

Recruitment

The division was recruited primarily in Thuringia: its Prussian elements were from Prussian Saxony while its other elements were from the smaller Thuringian states.  The 71st Infantry was from Prussian Saxony and the Principality of Schwarzburg-Sondershausen.  The 94th Infantry was the regiment of the Grand Duchy of Saxe-Weimar-Eisenach.  The 95th Infantry was from the Duchies of Saxe-Coburg-Gotha and Saxe-Meiningen.  The 96th Infantry had one battalion from Prussian Saxony, one from the Reuss principalities, and one from Schwarzburg-Rudolstadt.

Combat chronicle

The division began the war on the Western Front, fighting in Belgium and participating in the capture of the fortifications at Namur.  It was soon transferred to the Eastern Front, where it saw action in the First Battle of the Masurian Lakes and in the Gorlice-Tarnów Offensive.  It was transferred to the Western Front in October 1915, and after a period of fighting along the Aisne, entered the Battle of Verdun in 1916.  It then saw action in the later phases of the Battle of the Somme.  It remained along the Somme until 1917, and then fought in the battles of Arras and Passchendaele.  In 1918, it fought in various defensive battles against Allied offensives and counteroffensives.  Allied intelligence rated the division as a good division and considered it second class by 1918.

Pre-World War I organization

The organization of the 38th Division in 1914, shortly before the outbreak of World War I, was as follows:

76.Infanterie-Brigade
3. Thüringisches Infanterie-Regiment Nr. 71
6. Thüringisches Infanterie-Regiment Nr. 95
83.Infanterie-Brigade
Infanterie-Regiment Großherzhog von Sachsen (5. Thüringisches) Nr. 94
7. Thüringisches Infanterie-Regiment Nr. 96
38. Kavallerie-Brigade
Jäger-Regiment zu Pferde Nr. 2
Jäger-Regiment zu Pferde Nr. 6
38. Feldartillerie-Brigade
1. Thüringisches Feldartillerie-Regiment Nr. 19
2. Thüringisches Feldartillerie-Regiment Nr. 55
Landwehr-Inspektion Erfurt

Order of battle on mobilization

On mobilization in August 1914 at the beginning of World War I, most divisional cavalry, including brigade headquarters, was withdrawn to form cavalry divisions or split up among divisions as reconnaissance units.  Divisions received engineer companies and other support units from their higher headquarters.  The 38th Division was redesignated the 38th Infantry Division. Its initial wartime organization was as follows:

76. Infanterie-Brigade
3. Thüringisches Infanterie-Regiment Nr. 71
6. Thüringisches Infanterie-Regiment Nr. 95
83. Infanterie-Brigade
Infanterie-Regiment Großherzhog von Sachsen (5. Thüringisches) Nr. 94
7. Thüringisches Infanterie-Regiment Nr. 96
Halbregiment Kürassier-Regiment (Brandenburgisches) Nr. 6
38. Feldartillerie-Brigade
1. Thüringisches Feldartillerie-Regiment Nr. 19
2. Thüringisches Feldartillerie-Regiment Nr. 55
2.Kompanie/Kurhessisches Pionier-Bataillon Nr. 11
3.Kompanie/Kurhessisches Pionier-Bataillon Nr. 11

Late World War I organization

Divisions underwent many changes during the war, with regiments moving from division to division, and some being destroyed and rebuilt. During the war, most divisions became triangular - one infantry brigade with three infantry regiments rather than two infantry brigades of two regiments (a "square division"). An artillery commander replaced the artillery brigade headquarters, the cavalry was further reduced, the engineer contingent was increased, and a divisional signals command was created. The 38th Infantry Division's order of battle on April 20, 1918, was as follows:

83. Infanterie-Brigade
Infanterie-Regiment Großherzhog von Sachsen (5. Thüringisches) Nr. 94
6. Thüringisches Infanterie-Regiment Nr. 95
7. Thüringisches Infanterie-Regiment Nr. 96
3.Eskadron/Kürassier-Regiment (Brandenburgisches) Nr. 6
Artillerie-Kommandeur 38
1. Thüringisches Feldartillerie-Regiment Nr. 19
Fußartillerie-Bataillon Nr. 61
Stab Pionier-Bataillon Nr. 135
3.Kompanie/Kurhessisches Pionier-Bataillon Nr. 11
Pionier-Kompanie Nr. 284
Minenwerfer-Kompanie Nr. 38
Divisions-Nachrichten-Kommandeur 38

References
 38. Infanterie-Division  (Chronik 1914/1918) - Der erste Weltkrieg
 Claus von Bredow, bearb., Historische Rang- und Stammliste des deutschen Heeres (1905)
 Hermann Cron et al., Ruhmeshalle unserer alten Armee (Berlin, 1935)
 Hermann Cron, Geschichte des deutschen Heeres im Weltkriege 1914-1918 (Berlin, 1937)
 Günter Wegner, Stellenbesetzung der deutschen Heere 1815-1939. (Biblio Verlag, Osnabrück, 1993), Bd. 1
 Histories of Two Hundred and Fifty-One Divisions of the German Army which Participated in the War (1914-1918), compiled from records of Intelligence section of the General Staff, American Expeditionary Forces, at General Headquarters, Chaumont, France 1919 (1920, online)

Footnotes

Infantry divisions of Germany in World War I
Military units and formations established in 1899
Military units and formations disestablished in 1919
1899 establishments in Germany